Parkietenbos is a village near the Queen Beatrix International Airport. This village also has the landfill and container site of the island.

References

Geography of Aruba
Landfills